Hur Do-hwan (Hangul: 허도환) (born July 31, 1984) is a South Korean catcher for the KT Wiz in the KBO League. He bats and throws right-handed.

Amateur career
After graduating from Seoul High School, Hur was drafted by the Doosan Bears in the second round (63rd overall) of the 2003 KBO League draft. Hur did not sign with them; instead he opted for college, attending Dankook University. Hur was a four-year starting catcher for Dankook University from -. In the series, Hur played in two games as a starting catcher. In Game 1, Huh went 2-for-3 with a RBI and 2 runs. In that game, he hit a double in the third inning and a solo home run in the fifth inning off 2006 Collegiate Baseball Player of the Year winner and future Diamondbacks' prospect Wes Roemer.

Notable international careers

Professional career
Signed by the Doosan Bears in  after graduation from Dankook University, Hur began his rookie season in the Bears' second team. He was promoted into the 26-man first team roster in the middle of the season but was relegated to the second team again due to the ligament injury to his elbow, playing in only one game as a substitute catcher.

Hur was waived by the team after the 2007 season, and served his two years of military duty as a public service agent.

In  when he was discharged from the military duty, Hur signed a one-year contract as a free agent with the Nexen Heroes. He started his 2011 season playing for the Heroes' second team in the Futures League. On June 1, Hur was called up to the Heroes' first team after a waist injury landed the starting catcher Kang Kwi-Tae on the disabled list. On June 2, he hit an RBI double off reliever Bryan Corey against the Lotte Giants. On June 10, Hur played in his first starting lineup as a catcher. On June 16, Hur went 2-for-4 with 2 RBI against the Doosan Bears, and he subsequently earned a regular spot behind the plate for the Heroes.

External links 
 KBO League career statistics from Koreabaseball.com

1984 births
Living people
South Korean baseball players
Doosan Bears players
Kiwoom Heroes players
Hanwha Eagles players
SSG Landers players
KBO League catchers